Lukyantsevo is a rural locality (a village) in Nikiforovskoye Rural Settlement, Ustyuzhensky District, Vologda Oblast, Russia. The population was 60 as of 2002. There are three streets.

Geography 
Demtsyno is the nearest rural locality.

References 

Rural localities in Ustyuzhensky District